The Lake Proctor Wilderness Area is a  wooded site located in east Seminole County, Florida, United States, near the town of Geneva and to the west of Lake Harney. Habitats such as sand pine scrub, pine flatwoods, sandhill and bayhead swamp are highlighted in the area. Wildlife observed on this site includes the wood duck, white-tailed deer, red fox and Florida worm lizard. Benches are provided at several locations.

This site's variety of habitats and beautiful trail system make it a popular destination for local equestrians, mountain bikers, hikers, boy scout troops and other outdoor enthusiasts.

History
This site was purchased through the Seminole County Natural Lands Program which was put in place in 1990 by the Citizens and Board of County Commissioners through recognition of the role conservation and natural resources play in promoting and protecting a quality community.

Education
Seminole County's Leisure Services uses the area as an outside classroom through the Green Seminole Project. They cover topics that include prescribed fire, wildlife management and water quality.

See also
Lake Harney
State Road 46
Geneva, Florida

References

External links
Official Website of the Wilderness Area
Trails.Com entry

Protected areas of Seminole County, Florida
Wilderness areas of Florida